Andrew "Andy" Marvel (born Andrew Michael Saidenberg, July 2, 1958, New York City) is an American songwriter and record producer based out of New York City. He has written songs for Celine Dion, Diana King, Jessica Simpson and Colleen Fitzpatrick. His songs, including "Shy Guy", "With You", and "Treat Her Like a Lady" have appeared on albums that have sold over 70 million copies worldwide.

Biography
Marvel grew up in a musical family. His grandfather was first-chair cellist for the Chicago Symphony. His uncle played Greenwich Village coffeehouses in the ‘60s.  He started playing gigs at age ten, learned the formal rules of music at Oberlin College and the Berklee School Of Music, then crammed his calendar with punk sets at CBGB’s, a concert with B. B. King at Radio City Music Hall, and sessions as a keyboard player for with Madonna, Chaka Khan, and other hitmakers.

In the 1980s, he was a member of Members Only, a jazz ensemble who recorded for Muse Records.

Marvel found his biggest success working with Ric Wake on Celine Dion records.  While working with Ric Wake he met Peter Zizzo. Marvel and Zizzo would later become partners to build Big Baby Recording in 1999. Home-base for Marvel is Big Baby Recording, in Chelsea, Manhattan. There, surrounded by the latest music technology, he continues his pursuit of the Holy Grail in pop music: “an eclectic, unique sound that’s married to solid, memorable pop hooks.”

Marvel's music has been covered by Maxi Priest, Jon Secada, Dream, Patti Austin, Jessica Andrews, Eternal, Nikki Webster, Jennifer Brown, and Garou. He has scored the theme song for a popular Japanese TV show and the title track for the Oscar-winning documentary, When We Were Kings, and has had his songs placed on soundtracks for Bad Boys, My Best Friend’s Wedding, and The First Wives Club.

Discography

References

1958 births
Living people
Record producers from New York (state)
Songwriters from New York (state)
Members Only (band) members
American male songwriters